Louise Hampton (23 December 1879 – 10 February 1954) was a British actress. Although her career began when she was a child, it was for "the pathos and dignity of her elderly, motherly roles" that she was best known.

Life and career

Early years
Hampton was born in Stockport, Cheshire, the daughter of the actor Henry Hampton and his wife, Margaret, née Douglas. She made her stage debut at the age of four at the Queen's Theatre, Manchester as Henri, the child in Belphegor. In 1899 she married the actor Edward Thane (1873–1954). In 1911 she toured Australia under the management of George Marlow, in a repertory of melodramas. In November 1912, she played Wanda in The People's King, and in 1913 she toured in Egypt, playing leading parts in a repertory company. In 1914–15 she toured Britain in The Blindness of Virtue, The Second Mrs. Tanqueray (in the title role) and Outcast. Her first London appearance was at the Court Theatre in February 1917, where she appeared as Mrs Benson in Ruts, in a cast that included Hilda Trevelyan, Sydney Fairbrother, Lydia Bilbrooke and Nina Boucicault.

West End roles

After her success in Ruts at the Court, Hampton began a long series of London parts. According to The Stage, some of her outstanding roles were Mrs Jones in The Silver Box (Court, 1922), Elizabeth Channing in Secrets (Comedy Theatre, 1922), Miss Prism in The Importance of Being Earnest (Haymarket Theatre, 1923), Margaret Heal in The Fanatics (Ambassadors Theatre, 1927), Mrs Pembroke in Nine Till Six (Apollo, 1930), Charlotte Ardsley in For Services Rendered (Globe Theatre, 1932), Mrs Alving in Ghosts (Arts Theatre, 1933), Mrs Haggett in The Late Christopher Bean (St James's Theatre, 1933). Madam Wang in Lady Precious Stream (Little Theatre, 1934), Vicky Benton in Living Room (Garrick Theatre, 1943). and Mrs Borkman in John Gabriel Borkman (Arts, 1950).

Several newspapers called Hampton "everybody's favourite mother". The Times commented that she would be remembered particularly for her performance as "the weary, kindly, heartbroken woman who runs a shop" in Nine Till Six, in the title role of Čapek's The Mother, and for "her exquisite portrait … of a woman whose upbringing and memories enable her to meet death with smiling dignity" in For Services Rendered.

Her last role, a few weeks before she died, was as the Mother Superior in "The Return" at the Q Theatre. Her husband, Edward Thane, predeceased her by three weeks. She died in Charing Cross Hospital, London, on 10 February 1954.

Films
Hampton appeared in a variety of film roles. She made her film debut in 1911, in the silent thriller Driving a Girl to Destruction. This was the first of many film appearances over the years, often latterly in supporting roles.

Partial filmography
 Brown Sugar (1922) – Miss Gibson
 The Eleventh Commandment (1924) – Lady Barchester
 Nine till Six (1932) – Madam
 His Lordship Goes to Press (1939) – Mrs. Hodges
 Hell's Cargo (1939) – civil defense warden
 Goodbye, Mr. Chips (1939) – Mrs. Wickett
 The Middle Watch (1940) – Charlotte Hopkinson
 Busman's Honeymoon (1940) – Mrs. Ruddle
 The House of the Arrow (1940) – Mme. Harlow
 The Saint Meets the Tiger (1943) – Aunt Agatha Gurten
 Bedelia (1946) – Hannah
 Files from Scotland Yard (1951) – Agatha Steele
 Scrooge (1951) – Laundress
 The Story of Robin Hood and His Merrie Men (1952) – Tyb
 The Oracle (1953) – Miss Turner
 Background (1953) – Miss Russell

Notes, references and sources

Notes

References

Sources

External links
 

1879 births
1954 deaths
English stage actresses
English film actresses
English television actresses
People from Stockport
20th-century English actresses